Shut may refer to:

Yana Shut (born 1997), Belarusian snooker and pool player.
Shut (1988 film), directed by Andrei Andreyevich Eshpai.
Shut (2009 film), starring Lee Baxter.
Shut or šwt, "shadow", an Ancient Egyptian concept of the soul or spirit.

See also 
Shutdown (disambiguation)
Shut-in (disambiguation)
Shut Out (disambiguation)
Shut up (disambiguation)